is a dam in Takaoka, Kōchi Prefecture, Japan.

Dams in Kōchi Prefecture